Orcas, or killer whales, are large predatory cetaceans that were first captured live and displayed in exhibitions in the 1960s. They soon became popular attractions at public aquariums and aquatic theme parks due to their intelligence, trainability, striking appearance, playfulness in captivity and sheer size. As of February 2019, captive orcas reside at facilities in North and South America, Europe and Asia.

The first North Eastern Pacific orca, Wanda, was captured in November 1961 by a collecting crew from Marineland of the Pacific, and over the next 15 years, around 60 to 70 orcas were taken from Pacific waters for this purpose. When the US Marine Mammal Protection Act of 1972 effectively stopped the capture of Pacific orcas, captures were made in Icelandic waters. Since 2010, captures have been made in Russian waters. However, facilities in the United States such as SeaWorld have not collected wild orcas in over 35 years.

25 of the 33 orcas on display in the US, Argentina, Spain, and France were born in captivity. Six of the seven displayed in Japan are captive-born. An additional 13 orcas reported in China and Russia were captured in Russian waters. Kalina, born in September 1985, was the first captive-born orca calf to survive more than a few days. In September 2001, Kasatka gave birth to Nakai, the first orca conceived through artificial insemination, at SeaWorld San Diego. This technique lets park owners maintain a more healthy genetic mix in the small groups of orcas at each park, while avoiding the stress of moving orcas for breeding purposes.

List of captive orcas

List of unknown captive orca status

List of deceased captive orcas 

*Please note that not all orcas that died in the capture operations are listed.

Notable captive orcas

Living

Adán
He was born on October 13, 2010, at Loro Parque. He is the result of inbreeding between Kohana and Keto. His mother, eight-year-old Kohana, showed no maternal interest in him at birth. As a result, he was bottle-fed by staff until May 2011 when he was permanently moved onto fish. Adán's only full-blooded sibling, Victoria, died in 2013.

Corky

Corky is a 57-year-old female orca at SeaWorld San Diego. She is the longest-held captive orca in the world, the largest female orca in captivity, and the second oldest orca to ever be displayed to the public. She is now the only survivor from the Northern Resident captures. Around the age of four, Corky was captured in Pender Harbour off the coast of British Columbia on December 11, 1969. From there, she went to Marineland of the Pacific and lived with three other orcas. However, the two orcas who she was captured with died after three years and she spent most of her time at Marineland with an orca bull named Orky. Corky has been pregnant seven times, resulting in four live births from 1977 to 1985 (with two failures in 1986 and 1987), none of which survived the first two months of life.

On January 21, 1987, during her seventh pregnancy, she and Orky were moved to SeaWorld San Diego. She settled well in the new environment, but she had problems with one of the Icelandic orcas, Kandu V. The two females fought for dominance and it peaked during a show in 1989, resulting in Kandu's death. Corky is also used as the "Welcome Whale" for new trainers and new orcas. She has also "adopted" some of the whales she has been with. She has been a surrogate mother to Sumar, Splash, Orkid, and Keet. Corky is easy to identify, mostly because of her large size for a female, her tall unbent dorsal fin, the small 'chips' in her dorsal fin, and a nick in her left dorsal fluke. She also has experienced problems in aggression from a male named Ulises. "At SeaWorld, Ulises is dominant over some of the female orcas, especially Corky. In fact, trainers would not allow Corky and Ulises to be in the same pool unless Kasatka, the then ultimate matriarch, was present to keep both whales calm." Since Kasatka's death in 2017, Corky and Ulises are no longer allowed to be in the same pool together.

Earth
 was born at Kamogawa Sea World located in Chiba Prefecture, Japan on October 13, 2008. "Kamogawa is the location of Kamogawa Seaworld, which opened in 1970. . . Lovey gave birth to Earth on October 13, 2008, which makes Lovey the first captive-born mother in a Japanese marine park". His mother is Lovey and his father is Oscar who died on December 21, 2012.

Ikaika

Ikaika (pronounced ee-KY-ka; Hawaiian for "strong") is a male orca born at SeaWorld Orlando in Florida on August 25, 2002. He is the offspring of Tilikum (father) and Katina (mother), making him Katina's fifth calf. To decide the name of the newborn whale a poll was taken. The following names were chosen to be on the poll: Ikaika (Hawaiian for "strong"), Mottaka (Icelandic for "reception"), Ramu (in honor of the late whale by that name), Tsunami (Japanese) and Ramius (after the Captain in "The Hunt for Red October").

Ikaika was transferred to Marineland of Canada in Ontario, Canada on a breeding loan on November 18, 2006, in exchange for three male beluga whales – Juno, Aurek, and Klondike – who joined Spooky within the Wild Arctic area of SeaWorld Orlando. On November 13, 2011, Ikaika was transported to SeaWorld San Diego, where he joined six other whales; Ulises, Corky, Orkid, Kasatka, Nakai, and Kalia. As of December 2021, Ikaika is SeaWorld San Diego's largest orca as well as the largest orca in the US weighing in at 9,900 pounds and 21.9 ft long. He spends most of his time with Corky or Makani.

Kalia
Kalia was born at SeaWorld San Diego on December 21, 2004 at 9:22 a.m. in Shamu Stadium's main show pool following a little more than two hours of labor and was estimated to weigh between 300 pounds and 500 pounds and measure 6 to 7 feet. Her parents are Kasatka and Keet. She is also known as GreatGrandbaby Shamu. Her siblings are Takara (1991) Nakai (2001-2022), Halyn (2005–2008) and Makani (2013). The name Kalia is Hawaiian for "beauty". Kalia met her father for the first time when he returned to San Diego in February 2012. Kalia gave birth to Amaya on December 2, 2014, at 12:34 pm. Amaya's father was Ulises,  the form of conception is unknown, either naturally or through artificial insemination. Amaya died in 2021.
Since her mother's passing in 2017, Kalia has taken over as the matriarch of the San Diego pod.

Katina

Katina is a female who lives in SeaWorld Orlando. She was captured near Iceland at about three years of age on October 26, 1978. She is healthy and the most successful breeding female orca in captivity.

Upon her capture, Katina was purchased by Marineland (Ontario). In 1979, Katina was bought by SeaWorld and was sent to their park in San Diego. In 1982, Katina was moved to SeaWorld Ohio in Aurora, Ohio with another female named Kasatka, with whom she was captured in 1978. For two years, the two would perform in the Ohio park during the summer months and then be moved back to San Diego for the winter. Finally, in 1984, Katina was transferred to the SeaWorld in Orlando.

Katina became pregnant in early spring of 1984 at SeaWorld San Diego from a male named Winston. Soon after, she was moved back to SeaWorld Ohio for the summer. The trainers soon realized she was pregnant, so she was moved to Orlando at the end of the summer season, where she gave birth on September 26, 1985, to a female who was named Kalina. Although ten orca calves had been born in captivity prior to Kalina, none had survived past a few weeks. Kalina was the first orca calf to be successfully born and raised in captivity. Kalina was taken from her mother at 4 years 5 months and conducted on a trip around all four SeaWorld parks.

In early 1987, an adult male named Kanduke arrived in Orlando. He and Katina soon mated. Katina bore her second calf on November 4, 1988, a female named Katerina. In early 1991 at a very early age Katerina was transferred out of Orlando. Katerina died on May 5, 1999, at SeaWorld San Antonio at 10.5 years of age. A male named Tilikum came to SeaWorld in January 1992. It wasn't long before Katina was pregnant again. She gave birth to her first son on September 9, 1993, named Taku. Katina's next calf came on December 27, 1996, a female named Unna. Her fifth calf was a male born on August 25, 2002, named Ikaika. Katina gave birth to her sixth calf, a female named Nalani, on September 18, 2006. She gave birth to her seventh calf, a male named Makaio on October 9, 2010, at 7:28 p.m. The great-grandmother went into labor at 6:47 p.m. and delivered a -long, 350-pound male calf. He swam to the surface moments later for his first breath. She has six grandchildren, Keet, Keto, Tuar, Skyla, Trua and Nalani, as well as four great grandchildren, Kalia, Halyn, Adán and Vicky. Kalia gave birth to Katina's first great-great grandchild, Amaya, on December 2, 2014.

Katina lives with two of her seven calves (Nalani and Makaio) and her grandson (Trua). She is always with her calf, but is also with Nalani quite often. She is grouped with her son Makaio, Trua, Malia, and Nalani.

Katina appeared on a That's My Baby episode, where she gave birth to Ikaika.

Keet
Keet is a bull orca who was born on February 2, 1993, in SeaWorld San Antonio. "Keet" is a Tlingit language word meaning "orca". His parents are Kalina and Kotar. Keet is also known as Grandbaby Shamu because his mother is the first orca to be born and raised under human care successfully.

When he was 1 year and 8 months of age, his mother was moved to SeaWorld Orlando in Florida to support her next pregnancy, Keet's brother Keto was born in 1995. Katerina, his aunt, was moved in from SeaWorld Ohio. In 1995, his father, Kotar, died. On May 5, 1999, Katerina died. Five months later, two females named Kayla and Winnie were moved in. In November 1999, he was moved to SeaWorld San Diego in California. There, he met his brother, Keto, and his playmate, Sumar. All three whales were moved to SeaWorld Ohio in February 2000. On February 15, 2001, Keet was returned to California; Sumar followed three days later, while Keto was relocated to SeaWorld San Antonio in Texas. Keet's best friends were the bull Ulises and a maturing male named Splash. On April 24, 2004, Keet was moved to his birthplace, meeting Kyuquot, Unna, Kayla, Keto, Tuar, and Tekoa.

Keet is a gentle and agile performer. On December 21, 2004, he became a father for the first time when Kalia, his daughter, was born at SeaWorld San Diego. On October 9, 2005, his mate Kayla gave birth to his second daughter Halyn, at SeaWorld San Antonio. He may have fathered Unna's stillborn in April 2006 and Kayla's miscarriage in spring 2007. Keet may have fathered the possible 2 extra pregnancies of Unna claimed by Bridgette Pirtle. Keet was the lowest ranking adult orca in the dominance chain at SeaWorld Texas. He is very sweet and was often used as a "starter whale" for new trainers along with a younger male named Tuar. On June 15, 2008, SeaWorld announced Halyn died unexpectedly; a necropsy was performed and the test results have been announced.

Keet moved back to Seaworld San Diego on February 27, 2012, and he has been reunited with three of his old friends Corky, Ulises and Orkid. He met his first daughter Kalia who was 7 years old when he returned.  Keet became a grandfather on December 2, 2014, when Kalia gave birth to Amaya.

Keijo
Keijo is a bull orca who was born in captivity at Marineland Antibes on November 20, 2013. "Keijo (Finnish for "Elf" or "Supernatural Being") weighs about 330 pounds (Jan 2014). His father is Wikie's half-brother Valentin".

Keto
Keto is a bull orca who was born on June 17, 1995. His parents are Kalina and Kotar. Keto has lived at all four Seaworld parks since he was separated from his mother at age 3.

When Keto was 10 years old he was moved to Loro Parque with Tekoa, his half-niece Kohana, and his half-sister Skyla. On Christmas Eve 2009, Keto killed trainer Alexis Martinez during training.

Kshamenk
Kshamenk (pronounced sha-MEN-k) is a male orca that was taken from the wild off the coast of Argentina in 1992. The population he comes from is unknown. He was approximately five years old at the time, making him roughly 30 years old. Initial reports said that Kshamenk, along with three members of his pod, had stranded and been "rescued" by Mundo Marino. However, it was later revealed that Mundo Marino had "force stranded" the whales by placing a large net between the whales and the shore. When the tide went out, the whales were left stranded on the beach. One was released, one died on the way to the aquarium, one beat himself to death on the walls of his enclosure, and one, Kshamenk, survived.

When Kshamenk arrived at Mundo Marino he was kept with a female orca, "Belen." They performed in the orca show together for eight years. Kshamenk impregnated Belen in 1998 but the female calf was stillborn 16 months later. Belen died shortly after in February 2000, leaving Kshamenk alone. After a veterinary evaluation in 2006, Kshamenk was considered non-releasable.

In November 2001 Six Flags Worlds of Adventure, located in Aurora, Ohio, filed a request to import Kshamenk with the National Marine Fisheries Service. 35 anti-captivity organizations including, the Wild Earth Foundation, Humane Society of the United States, Cetacean Society International, and Earth Island Institute, opposed the transfer of Kshamenk in favor of his rehabilitation and release. In July 2002 the Secretary of the Environment of Argentina and CITES Argentina denied the request of Mundo Marino to export the whale. In Argentina, it is illegal to export native fauna, and as a wild born orca, Kshamenk is a part of the commonwealth.

Kshamenk still resides at Mundo Marino. On February 14, 2013, Kshamenk became a father via artificial insemination to Makani, a male calf born to Kasatka at SeaWorld San Diego, and to a female calf named Kamea, born to Takara at SeaWorld San Antonio on December 6, 2013.

Kyuquot
Kyuquot is an orca at the Seaworld San Antonio, Texas. His parents are Tilikum and Haida II, he was born on Christmas Eve in 1991, at Sealand Victoria, British Columbia, Canada.

Ky only lived here for a short amount of time. After an incident in which a trainer died he moved to a SeaWorld park. Kyuquot was very close to his mother, who died in 2001. Over time, Ky became very close to several females who came to Texas, but is now often grouped with his half-brother, Tuar.

He used to perform waterworks, though after several incidents, he was not allowed to anymore. Ky is a very large male and can still do many athletic behaviors such as front flips. He is the largest orca at San Antonio, weighing over 9,000 pounds and over 22 ft long. He is a reliable whale and is most often grouped with Tuar, though he likes spending time with Takara and can be seen with any of his pod mates. On April 19, 2017, Takara gave birth to Kyara, and after Kyara died at 3 months old, it was announced that DNA tests showed that Kyuquot was her father.

Lolita

Lolita (Low lita), originally known as Tokitae (Toh-kih-tay), is an orca at the Miami Seaquarium. Lolita is the oldest orca ever in captivity. She was a member of the L pod. Researchers believe she is the only living offspring of matriarch L-25 "Ocean Sun". When she was about four years old, she was captured on August 8, 1970, at Penn Cove, Puget Sound, off the coast of Washington. The Penn Cove capture became controversial due to the large number of wild orcas that were taken (seven) and the number of deaths that resulted: four juveniles died, as well as one adult female who drowned when she became tangled in a net while attempting to reach her calf.

When she first arrived at Miami Seaquarium, Lolita was put in the 'Whale Bowl'. Miami Seaquarium had another orca, Hugo, who lived in a different tank, called the 'Celebrity Bowl', which now houses manatees. The two orcas would vocalize to each other, and Hugo was later moved into the Whale Bowl with Lolita. At first, they were aggressive with each other, but then became more compatible with each other and more aggressive towards their trainers. Lolita and Hugo mated several times, and it was reported that Lolita was pregnant from this. However, she never delivered a live offspring. Lolita has not seen another orca since Hugo died in 1980. She vocalizes in captivity, in the unique calls used only by her pod. When played recordings of her wild family members, she responded. She is still apparently healthy. This makes her one of the largest female orcas in captivity. Lolita currently lives in the Miami Seaquarium's Whale and Dolphin Stadium, where she performs 1–2 shows daily, and shares her tank with four Pacific White-Sided dolphins. Despite her size, her tank is the smallest orca habitat in the United States, measuring 35 feet wide and 80 feet long. Lolita is the subject of the documentary Lolita: Slave to Entertainment released in 2008. Various groups have called for Lolita to be released into the wild.

Whale activists have proceeded to sue the U.S. government in federal court in Seattle, claiming that Lolita, captured from Puget Sound waters in 1970, should be accorded the same protection status granted to other Southern Resident orcas in 2005, as members of an endangered species.

In February 2015, the National Oceanic and Atmospheric Administration (NOAA) included Lolita in the endangered Southern Resident pod while noting the inclusion does not affect her residency at the Miami Seaquarium.

Lovey
 was born on January 11, 1998, at Kamogawa Sea World, to mother Stella and father Bingo/Thor. She was the first orca calf born successfully in Japan (there had been five calves born before her, but none lived for more than ten days). The only other orca at KSW at the time of her birth was Oscar, who would mate with her later on, once she was older. Her first calf was a male born on October 13, 2008, named Earth. Earth measures about 11.5 feet and weighs in at around 1,543 pounds (2011). Lovey's stage name is Oyako, Japanese for "parent and child". On July 19, 2012, Lovey gave birth to her second calf, a female named Luna. Luna measures about 7.8 feet and weighs in at around 620 pounds (November 2012). Her father is Oscar.

Lynn
Lynn is a female calf residing at the Port of Nagoya Public Aquarium in Japan. Lynn was born on November 13, 2012, to mother Stella and father Bingo. Unlike most orcas, Lynn was born head first, as was her older sister Ran 2. A public naming contest was held from March 20 to May 6, 2013. The park received a total of 19,384 applicants and 5,062 individual names, and settled on Lynn. Initial western reports named her as Rin, the direct but inaccurate Hepburn romanization of her name in katakana. Later content provided by the aquarium confirmed the correct transcription as Lynn.

Malia

Malia was born to Taima and Tilikum at SeaWorld Orlando on March 12, 2007. She was Taima's third calf and her name is Hawaiian for "calm and peaceful". She is learning new behaviors all the time and is used in shows daily alongside the other young orcas at SeaWorld Orlando. Malia's mother Taima died in June 2010 after a difficult labor that resulted in a stillborn male calf. Her eyepatches are long and skinny, and she has no marks, rakes, or chips in her tail fluke. Her teeth have bore holes where the pulp has been drilled to prevent bacterial infection as her teeth are worn down or broken by chewing on tank equipment. 
In January 2018, it was noted that Malia had begun to develop what appears to be a phototoxic reaction to unknown medications she is being given, but SeaWorld has not made any public statements regarding her condition. Photographs show her with a brownish lesion extending along her lower jaw, similar to the lesions that Kasatka displayed in the months before her death. This may be a worrying sign that Malia is being treated for a serious infection, and that the illness is being exacerbated by exposure to sunlight in her clear, shallow enclosure with little protection from the sun.

Malvina 
Malvina is a 7-year-old female orca who arrived at TINRO in summer or fall 2015 from Russia. Unfortunately, not much is known about Malvina. Her location is unknown. She was believed to be captured in one of three captures in July 2015. Newer info also says that she had escaped or passed away in 2016. Nothing has been confirmed.

Makaio
Katina (orca) delivered her 7th calf on October 9, 2010, after a short 41-minute labor. The father is Tilikum. It was announced on November 3, 2010, that the calf was a healthy boy. The calf has interacted with all the  members of the pod, and plays well with them. His name was decided by a poll with three names to vote for on SeaWorld Orlando's official Facebook page. The names were Nico, Greek for "Victory", Makaio, the Hawaiian form of the name Matthew, meaning "Gift of God," or Haruki, Japanese for "Shining Brightly." Makaio was the name chosen. He can be seen in SeaWorld's Orca Encounter show.

Makani
Kasatka's fourth calf is a male, born on Valentine's Day 2013 at 6:33 a.m. His name was chosen by a poll. The choices were "Hako", Norse for "chosen son", "Valentino", Italian for "strong", and "Makani", Hawaiian for "the wind". His name was announced on June 14, 2013. His siblings are Kalia, Nakai, and Takara. His father is Kshamenk at Mundo Marino. Makani can already swim upside down and wave his fluke. Makani can also do complex behaviors. Makani's father, Kshamenk, is an Argentinian transient orca (origin unknown) and his mother, Kasatka, is a resident Icelandic orca, making him a hybrid of the two vastly different ecotypes. Other such hybrids include the late Taima, her deceased sister Katerina, Taima's three calves and Kamea. Currently, Makani is 9 years old, measures at least 17.4 feet long and weighs 4,500 pounds which makes him massive compared to most other young males his age and is currently growing at a rapid pace.

Moana
On March 16, 2011, Wikie gave birth to Moana, her first calf in Marineland of Antibes. Initially, it was stated that the calf was a girl so they had a naming contest on Facebook and the name "Moana" (Maori for "ocean") won, but a report in July confirmed that she was in fact a he. Marineland confirmed that his name will not be changed. It is also confirmed that Ulises of SeaWorld San Diego is the father. The calf was conceived via artificial insemination.

Moana became a big brother when his mother gave birth to Keijo on November 20, 2013.

Morgan

Morgan was rescued from the Wadden Sea on June 23, 2010. The estimated 1.5 year-old orca was alone, malnourished and underweight. She was transferred to Dolfinarium Harderwijk where she was taken care of for several months. After it became clear she couldn't been released into the wild, the Dolfinarium searched for another facility to take care of her, because their basins were too small. Morgan moved to Loro Parque on November 29, 2011. In 2012, Loro Parque announced there was a good possibility that Morgan is partially deaf. In December 2017, Loro Parque announced Morgan was pregnant with her first calf.

Nalani

Nalani is a female orca who currently resides at SeaWorld Orlando, where she was born on September 18, 2006. Her parents are Katina and Taku (who is, due to inbreeding, also her brother). She is Katina's sixth calf, and was Taku's second. She is a very loving and curious youngster, but was very dependent on her mother in the first few years.  She is learning fast, as she is used in shows regularly alongside Trua, Malia, and Katina. An easy way to identify Nalani is how plump she is. She's grown to be bulky, like her mom, has round eyepatches, and her dorsal fin curves slightly to the left.

Orkid

Orkid was born September 23, 1988, in SeaWorld San Diego, California. Orkid's parents are Kandu V (her mother), and Orky II (her father). She was the first orca born in the San Diego SeaWorld Park successfully. Orky II died only three days after Orkid was born. She was named Orkid, in memory of her father (most likely a combination of "Orky" and "kid"). In August 1989, Kandu V charged Corky II during a live show. The blow broke Kandu V's jaw, and severed an artery in Kandu's head; apparently in an attempt to assert her dominance over Corky II. As a result, she began spouting blood with every breath she took. Forty five minutes later Kandu V sank to the bottom of the pool and died, bleeding to death. Orkid witnessed this; for weeks after the incident, she would circle the tanks calling out and vocalizing. However, she was raised by Corky, and later befriended a male named Splash. Orkid has been artificially inseminated many times, but has never gotten pregnant. Orkid is highly intelligent (having been affectionately nicknamed by trainers the "Rocket Scientist") and knows hundreds of behaviors. Only the most senior trainers are to work with her, as she has shown aggression toward trainers in the past. After an incident in 2006 where she dragged a trainer to the bottom of the show pool, Orkid has been barred from performing waterworks with trainers.

Sakari

Sakari was born on January 7, 2010, at SeaWorld San Antonio. Her mother is Takara and her father is Tilikum. Siblings on her mother's side include Kohana, Trua and Kamea. "Sakari" is an Inuit language word meaning "sweet.

Shouka
Born on February 25, 1993, in Antibes, France, to Sharkane and Kim 2, the female orca's first nine years were spent with her parents and siblings. In 2002, she was moved to Six Flags Worlds of Adventure (former SeaWorld Ohio) in Aurora, Ohio, near Cleveland. After Worlds of Adventure was sold, in 2004 Shouka was moved to Six Flags Discovery Kingdom (Marine World Africa USA) in Vallejo, California. She was the only orca at the park but had bottlenose dolphin companions named Merlin and Cupid for 7 years until they were relocated due to compatibility concerns. In July 2012, Shouka began to display aggressive behavior during one of her performances. She lifted a trainer into the air and knocked her trainer back into an open door area that leads to the back of the stage. Even after the trainer was gone, Shouka leaped two more times onto the stage. Six Flags moved Shouka to SeaWorld San Diego the next month in August 2012, where Corky immediately took her under her wing. She is currently fully integrated into the pod of ten orcas and is a highly athletic animal who enjoys working with her trainers.  Shouka is known for her bottlenose dolphin vocalizations and for her unique upward-curving tail flukes, which she has had since birth.

Takara
Takara (Japanese for "treasure") was born on July 9, 1991, at SWC to Kasatka and Kotar. She was the second "Baby Shamu" born at SWC, after Orkid in 1988. She gave birth to her first calf, a female named Kohana on May 3, 2002. Kasatka was by her side during the labor and she and Takara helped assist Kohana to the surface to take her first breath. She was conceived via artificial insemination, the father being Tilikum, a deceased bull orca who had been living on the other side of the country at SeaWorld Orlando.

Takara and Kohana were transferred to SeaWorld Orlando in 2004, likely to give Taku a mate. A year later, Takara gave birth to her second calf, a male named Trua, fathered by Taku. Kohana was later transferred out of SeaWorld Orlando to Loro Parque, a Spanish amusement park in the Canary Islands.

Takara was transferred to SeaWorld San Antonio in February 2009 in a supposed effort to improve space at SeaWorld Orlando. The move angered many since it separated her from her son, Trua.  However, other SeaWorld visitors and workers reported that she would often act aggressively toward Trua. It was later confirmed she was pregnant at the time (again from Tilikum). On January 7, 2010, Takara gave birth to another female calf in the main tank of the "Shamu Theatre" at SeaWorld San Antonio. On March 16, 2010, she was named Sakari, which is an Inuit word for "sweet". Takara became a grandmother on October 12, 2010, when her calf Kohana gave birth to her first calf Adán on October 12, 2010. Kohana had also given birth to Victoria on August 3, 2012.
Victoria died on June 16, 2013, when she was 10 months old, of intestinal issues. Takara delivered her fourth calf on December 6, 2013, a healthy female named Kamea. She gave birth to her fifth calf (and SeaWorld's last breeding calf), a female named Kyara, on April 19, 2017. Kyara died two months later, on July 24, due to pneumonia.

Takara was featured in an episode of That's My Baby, where she gave birth to her first calf, Kohana.

Tuar
Tuar is a 23-year-old male orca who lives at SeaWorld San Antonio. His father is Tilikum and his mother is Kalina. He was born at SeaWorld Orlando on June 22, 1999. Tuar used to perform waterworks until they were stopped in 2010.

Trua

Trua is a male orca born at SeaWorld Orlando on November 23, 2005. His parents are Takara and Taku, his grandfather is  Tilikum. Takara and Kohana (his sister) had just been moved to SeaWorld Orlando when she and Taku met. At the time of Trua's birth, Kohana was by Takara's side and thus acted as the midwife. Trua currently lives at SeaWorld Orlando with four other orcas: Katina (matriarch), Nalani, Malia and Makaio.
Trua had been learning waterworks before they were stopped in 2010. Trua's mother Takara was moved to SeaWorld San Antonio on February 5, 2009. Trua is easily identified because of his three dots and belly freckles. Trua has a dot in his eyepatch, and two dots on his neck. His freckles earned him the nickname, "Freckles". Currently, Trua who is now 16 years old, measures at a length of 19 feet and weighs 6,600 lbs(as of July 2021). Despite this, Trua is not yet fully grown.

Ulises

Ulises is the oldest and 2nd largest male orca in captivity with Ikaika now being the largest. He is currently living at SeaWorld San Diego in California with 9 other whales. He is often nicknamed, "Uli" or "Uli Bear" due to his gentle personality. He was captured in 1980 in Iceland and lived at several European parks including Barcelona Zoo, before being transported to SeaWorld San Diego in 1994. He became a father in 2011, when his son Moana was born through artificial insemination to Wikie at Marineland Antibes, France. On December 2, 2014, at 12:34 pm, a young female named Kalia gave birth to Ulises's daughter, Amaya, at SeaWorld San Diego. It is unknown whether the calf was conceived naturally or through artificial insemination. He is believed to have a low sperm count.

Deceased

This is a list of some notable orcas that died in captivity. It doesn't include every captive death.

Amaya
Amaya was a female orca born on December 2, 2014, at SeaWorld San Diego. Her mother was Kalia and her father was Ulises. Amaya was Kalia's first calf. She was born tail-first and was 6.5 feet long with a weight of 350 pounds at birth; her heritage was 93.75% Icelandic and 6.25% southern resident. She died unexpectedly on August 19, 2021.

Baby Shamu II
Baby Shamu II was born at SeaWorld San Diego in California on January 5, 1986. Her parents were Kenau and Winston. Because she was the second orca born at a SeaWorld park, she was nicknamed Baby Shamu II. The original Baby Shamu, aka Kalina, was her older half-sister, though Kalina had a different mother. Baby Shamu II was never given a real name as she died on January 16, 1986, just 12 days after she was born. The cause of death was a heart defect. Young orcas are born with heart valves open and they should close soon after birth. Unfortunately, Baby Shamu II had a respiratory infection and this worsened her condition. One of the valves did not close which caused Baby Shamu II to pass away.  She was 7 feet (2.1m) long and she weighed 135 kg (297 lb).

Bingo
Bingo was a 31-year-old male orca who lived at the Port of Nagoya Public Aquarium. He was captured in Iceland in 1984 and is the father of Lovey, Lara, Sarah, Ran II and Lynn and the grandfather of Earth and Luna. He died on August 2, 2014, of a respiratory illness.

Chimo
Chimo (also known as T4), was a young female transient (exclusive mammal-eater) orca exhibited in Sealand of the Pacific in South Oak Bay at The Oak Bay Marina, near the city of Victoria, British Columbia, Canada from 1970 to 1972. Chimo was the only partially albino orca ever exhibited in captivity. Years before her capture, another pure white orca was spotted in what is suspected to be the same pod, and named "Alice". Alice was never captured, and vanished in the 1960s. Chimo was captured when trying to find a mate for the park's star attraction, Haida. Chimo's probable mother was another orca by the name of Scarredjaw Cow (T3). She was captured alongside Chimo. Chimo died in 1972 from complications caused by Chédiak–Higashi syndrome, the syndrome which caused her albinism. Chimo never bore any calves.[1]

Freya
Freya was a 35-year-old female orca who lived at Marineland of Antibes. She was captured in October 1982 alongside Haida II, Kim II, Nootka IV, and an unnamed male. She and Kim went to Marineland Antibes from Hafnarfjordur Aquarium. She became the first European orca to become pregnant. Freya gave birth in March 1991 to a stillborn calf. She gave birth to another stillborn in March 1993. Sometime between this calf and her next, Freya had a tumor removed, leaving a white indent on her side. Freya gave birth to Valentin on February 13, 1996. In March 2001, Freya had yet another stillborn calf. In April 2003, Freya gave birth to her final calf and her fourth stillborn. She ceased to become pregnant due to birth control and the death of her mate Kim II in 2005. Freya was very depressed, but Valentin usually was able to cheer her up. Freya became a grandmother on November 20, 2013, when Valentin fathered a calf named Keijo, however, since the calf's mother Wikie was Valentin's half-sister, Valentin being the father has not been confirmed. After months of fighting an unknown illness, Freya lost her battle on June 20, 2015, leaving behind her son Valentin and likely grandson Keijo.

Gudrun
Gudrun (Goo drun) was an Icelandic female orca who lived at Dolfinarium Harderwijk in the Netherlands and at SeaWorld Orlando in Florida. Gudrun was caught close to the coast of Iceland on October 25, 1976. She was kept in captivity in the Dolfinarium Harderwijk in the Netherlands, where she was the main attraction. In 1987, Gudrun was moved to SeaWorld Orlando in Florida, United States, on a breeding loan. Gudrun gave birth to Taima on July 11, 1989, at 16:45 EST during a thunderstorm. Gudrun gave birth to Nyar on December 31, 1993. Nyar suffered with illness often. She was so both mentally and physically ill, it was reported that Gudrun tried to drown her during several shows. Nyar died at the age of two years in April 1996. On February 21, 1996, Gudrun went into labor with her last calf, which was fathered by Tilikum. After 20 hours of labor, Gudrun was unable to deliver the calf. Eventually after the physical intervention of park staff, Gudrun delivered a stillborn calf of underermined sex. Due to complications from the delivery, she died four days later.

In 1982, Gudrun was the subject of an experiment in two-communications, designed to see if she could learn new words and incorporate them into her vocabulary.

Hoi Wai
Hoi Wai was a female Orca captured near Iceland in October 1977. Initially brought to the Saedyrasafnid Aquarium in Iceland, she was moved in late October 1977 to the Dolfinarium Harderwijk in the Netherlands. Initially named Peanuts, she was moved to the Windsor Safari Park, where she was to stay until being moved to Ocean Park Hong Kong early in 1979, and where she was renamed Suzie Wong. Due to a dispute between SeaWorld and the safari park, she was transferred to Clacton Pier in August 1978 for the remainder of her training. A storm on New Year's Day 1979 damaged Clacton Pier, and she was sent back to Windsor Safari Park until the end of January.

On January 27, 1979, Suzie Wong was finally moved to Ocean Park Hong Kong, where she was renamed Hoi Wai, and would perform for life. She died on April 21, 1997, after a bloody wound was found in her intestines. She was the only orca at Ocean Park Hong Kong. A newspaper claimed that her skeleton is preserved at Cape D'Aguilar Marine Reserve, near Shek O, but the skeleton is actually from a Bryde's whale that stranded itself in Victoria Harbour in 1955.

Hoi Wai made an appearance in a movie called Moon Warriors.

Hyak
Hyak was about a year old when he was captured in Pender Harbour, British Columbia, Canada on April 24, 1968. He was captured with six other pod members, including Corky II and Natsidalia, who was thought to be his mother. He was probably from the A5 Pod. The captured whales were kept at Pender Harbour for some weeks before being transferred, and Natsidalia did not survive. Hyak was transferred to the Vancouver Aquarium, where he was kept with Skana, an orca captured the previous year. After Skana died in 1980, the aquarium purchased four new orcas captured in Iceland, and two of them—Finna and Bjossa—were transferred to the Vancouver Aquarium. Hyak and Bjossa produced a calf in 1987, but it only survived a short time. He sired another calf on Bjossa—K'yosha, but he did not live to see the calf's birth, as he died of pneumonia in February 1991. K'yosha only lived a few months beyond her father's death.

Junior
Junior was captured in Icelandic waters in November 1984. After a short stay at the Saedrysafnid Aquarium he arrived at Marineland Ontario in Canada on November 15, 1986. He did not settle in well at his new home, was hard to train, and did not get on well with his fellow orca tankmates. So Junior was put in a small tank in Marineland's warehouse, with no natural sunlight or air, and with noisy overhead fans. From time to time he shared his small tank with several dolphins. Marineland tried to keep Junior's conditions a secret, but members of the public released photos and films. Junior died in 1994.

K1/Taku

K1 was also named Taku. He was captured in August 1973 in Pedder Bay, British Columbia. While several other orcas that were caught with him were sold to other marine parks, K1 was too big to be sold. He was released on October 27, 1973, with a radio tag attached to his dorsal fin. Two nicks were cut by  into his dorsal fin to make it easier to identify and find him. He was given the adoption name of Taku. K1 reunited with his pod and was seen many times. K1 disappeared in 1997 and was presumed to have died at the age of 41, as his year of birth was believed to be 1955. K1 was a full blooded Southern Resident orca.

Kalina
Kalina (September 26, 1985 – October 4, 2010) was the first captive-born orca calf to survive more than a few days. Kalina's mother is an Icelandic female named Katina, and her father, Winston (also known as Ramu III) was a Pacific Southern Resident, making Kalina an Atlantic/Pacific hybrid – a unique situation that would not have occurred in the wild.

Kalina first appeared in shows at SeaWorld Orlando in 1986, billed as "Baby Shamu", performing with her mother. On February 12, 1990, Kalina was transferred to SeaWorld Ohio. She was moved again in October of that year to SeaWorld San Diego, and again on May 30, 1991, to SeaWorld San Antonio. In October 1994, Kalina was moved back to SeaWorld Orlando, where she lived with eight other killer whales, including her mother and a half sister.

Kalina gave birth to her first calf, a male named Keet, on February 2, 1993, at SeaWorld Texas. Kalina was only seven and a half years old at the time of Keet's birth – an extremely young age for an orca to become a mother. Kalina became pregnant again shortly after Keet's birth, and was moved back to SeaWorld Orlando in October 1994, where she gave birth to her second calf, another male, Keto on June 17, 1995. She gave birth to another male, Tuar, on June 22, 1999. Kalina bore her fourth calf and first daughter, on February 9, 2004, named Skyla. Skyla is now at Loro Parque along with Keto. Kalina was a gentle whale, learned quickly, and was used a lot in shows. She was used as a "starter whale" for new trainers. On Monday October 4, 2010, less than four months after Taima's death, Kalina died of preacute bacteremia sepsis at the age of 25. She has since become a great-grandmother with the birth of Amaya in December 2014.

Kandu V
Kandu V was a dominant female Icelandic orca, caught in 1977 and kept at SeaWorld San Diego in California. On August 21, 1989, she attempted to rake a 24-year-old newcomer orca, Corky II, during a live show. She struck Corky behind her dorsal fin, the resulting impact fracturing Kandu's upper jaw and severing major arteries. The crowd was quickly ushered out, and after a 45-minute hemorrhage, Kandu V died. Her daughter, Orkid, was 11 months old at the time of the accident.

Kanduke
Kanduke (can-duke) was captured from T pod in British Columbia, Canada, in August 1975. His mother is thought to be T7. He was sent to Sealand of the Pacific, Victoria, and then sold to Marineland, Canada. In January 1987, he was sold and moved to SeaWorld Orlando.

While at Marineland of Canada, he did 'water work' with his trainers, but once at SeaWorld he was described as a "moody and unpredictable" whale and the 'water work' was stopped. At SeaWorld Orlando, Kanduke often fought with a younger Icelandic male named Kotar. The aggression became increasingly serious. After an incident in which Kotar bit Kanduke's penis and caused an infection and show cancellations, the exhibitors decided to move the smaller whale to the newly opened SeaWorld San Antonio. On September 20, 1990, Kanduke died of St. Louis encephalitis, which is transmitted by mosquitoes. The cause of his death was later determined using information from his necropsy report provided by the Freedom of Information Act. This disease is non-existent in wild orcas because they don't spend enough time on the surface for mosquitoes to bite them. However, in captivity, the behavior of "logging" (i.e. just floating at the surface) puts orcas at risk for mosquito-borne illnesses. Kanduke has since become a grandfather with the births of Sumar, Tekoa, and Malia.

Kasatka

Kasatka was a 41-year-old female orca who lived at SeaWorld San Diego and the mother of Takara, Nakai, Kalia and Makani. She was  the park's dominant orca and she could be seen putting the other whales in their places including her own offspring. She was captured off the coast of Iceland on October 26, 1978, about the age of two. Her name probably comes from the Russian word Kasatka, a generic name for orcas. Kasatka became a grandmother for the first time when her daughter Takara gave birth to her first calf, a female born May 3, 2002, named Kohana. Takara gave birth a second time, on November 23, 2005, to a male named Trua in SeaWorld Orlando. Takara gave birth to her third calf, a female born January 7, 2010, named Sakari. Kasatka became a great grandmother on October 13, 2010, when Kohana gave birth to her first calf Adán. Kasatka gave birth to her fourth calf and second son on February 14, 2013, at 6:33 am after a one-hour labor. The calf was later named Makani.

Kasatka had shown aggression to humans. In 1993 Kasatka tried to bite a trainer during a show, and again in 1999. On November 30, 2006, Kasatka grabbed a trainer and dragged him underwater during their show. The trainer escaped and was later in good condition despite being underwater for a "brief" amount of time. Since this incident, Kasatka had been barred from performing waterworks with trainers and was never reintroduced to them.

Kasatka was euthanized August 15, 2017 after battling a chronic pulmonary infection for many years. Reason for euthanization was stated as chronic lung disease. She was euthanized after her health turned for the worst a few days leading up to August 15.

Katy 
The  calf was one of 15 Southern Resident Killer Whales, probably all from K Pod, who were involved in the Yukon Harbor orca capture operation. This first ever multi-orca capture, planned by Ted Griffin and his Seattle Public Aquarium party, began on February 15, 1967. The orcas were encircled by a modified, extra long purse seine net in shallow water in Yukon Harbor, on the west side of Puget Sound. Corraling and transferring selected whales to the aquarium at Pier 56, Seattle, proved to be a long and difficult process, however. Three died, two escaped, five were eventually secured by the aquarium, and five were released in the end, after 17 days inside a net.

On March 2, the small calf to be named Katy was shipped across Puget Sound to Pier 56. In her first published photograph, she shares a tank at the Seattle Public Aquarium with her as yet unnamed podmates Kandu, Kilroy and Ramu.
 
Griffin did not plan to keep all the orcas, and only Katy and Kandu remained in Seattle, where "schoolchildren crowded around the pool to get a look at the 'baby' killer whales." The aquarium's regular advertising featured the baby orcas, photographed with trainer Jerry Watmore, with hourly feedings as the leading attraction.

While at the Vancouver Boat Show with Katy's podmate known as Walter the Whale, Griffin organized "the first whale-to-whale telephone call in history." Katy and Kandu were at the other end of the line in Seattle, as pictured in the Seattle Times, but for the first 45 minutes, Walter only got a response from "two seals in a nearby tank," until finally the whales began talking "like crazy."

After two months, "the popular calf...died after ingesting a stick tossed into the pool by a careless visitor." In the evening of May 15, a veterinarian removed the piece of wood, but Katy's esophagus wall was torn and she died early the next morning. She was the second orca to die at Pier 56, preceded in 1966 by Namu.

Kayla

Kayla (November 26, 1988 – January 28, 2019) was a female who lived at SeaWorld San Antonio and SeaWorld Orlando. Her parents were Kenau and Orky II, both deceased. Kayla lived with her mother for the first two and a half years of her life. Kenau was moved to SeaWorld Orlando in January 1991, and Kayla was moved to SeaWorld Ohio in April 1991. Kayla lived there for the next eight years with another young female, named Katerina, who was three weeks older than she was. After Katerina was moved out, an older female named Winnie was moved in.

In November 1999, Kayla and Winnie were both transferred to SeaWorld San Antonio. Kayla and Winnie joined a female named Haida II and her son Kyuquot. A young male named Keto arrived in March 2001. Haida II died on August 1 of that year, making Winnie the new dominant female. Winnie died on April 11, 2002. Kayla became the new dominant orca in the stadium and was until her relocation to Orlando in 2006. After the death of Winnie, only three whales were left in the park: Kayla, Kyuquot, and Keto. A young female by the name of Unna was moved to the park in December 2002 to settle down Kyuquot and Keto, because the two maturing males were constantly fighting over Kayla. In November 2006, Kayla was transferred to SeaWorld Orlando leaving behind a mate Keet, and their daughter Halyn was raised by Unna immediately after Kayla's transfer. Once Kayla arrived, she immediately gave up her dominant role to Katina, who has been the dominant female there since 1988. In spring 2007, Kayla miscarried a male calf, likely the son of Keet.

Kayla gave birth to her first calf on October 9, 2005, a female named Halyn. Halyn was moved to a special animal care facility to be hand raised. Halyn lived in Animal Care in a different part of the park, and in May joined her family at Shamu Stadium. Halyn's father is Keet. On June 15, 2008, Halyn died unexpectedly.

On January 28, 2019, SeaWorld announced that Kayla had unexpectedly passed away after a two-day battle with an unknown illness. Veterinarians tried their best to treat Kayla, but she succumbed to her illness on the morning of January 28. She was 30 years old. The final cause of death has been announced and Kayla's "unknown illness" was lung disease.

Keiko

Keiko (1977 – December 12, 2003) was an orca who starred in the first of three Free Willy movies. Keiko died on December 12, 2003, after beaching himself during the night; pneumonia was later determined as the probable cause of death. Keiko was captured near Iceland in 1979 and sold to the Icelandic aquarium in Hafnarfjörður. Three years later, he was sold to Marineland of Canada, where he first started performing for the public and developed skin lesions indicative of poor health. He was then sold to Reino Aventura (now named Six Flags Mexico), an amusement park in Mexico City, in 1985. He was the star of the movie Free Willy in 1993.

The publicity from his role in Free Willy led to an effort by Warner Brothers Studio to find him a better home. Donations from the studio and Craig McCaw led to the establishment of the Free Willy Keiko Foundation in February 1995. With donations from the foundation and millions of school children, the Oregon Coast Aquarium in Newport, Oregon spent over US$7 million to construct facilities to return him to health with the hope of returning him to the wild. During his years in Oregon, he gained over a ton in weight.

On September 9, 1998, he was flown to Klettsvik Bay in Vestmannaeyjar in Iceland, and gradually reintroduced to the wild, returning to the open sea in July 2002. Keiko died on December 12, 2003, at the age of 27. Following requests from fans of the orca and Free Willy, the Oregon Coast Aquarium held a memorial service for him on February 20, 2004. 700 people attended the service, at which the aquarium's veterinary chaplain said, "Keiko was not one of our kind, but nonetheless was still one of us." There is a memorial site for Keiko set up by the locals in Halsa, Norway, where the orca spent the last year of his life.

Kenau
Kenau died in 1991 while pregnant with her third calf, whose father was Kotar. The calf fetus was male. Kenau was Kayla's mother.

Kim (Oum)
Kim was captured in November 1976 in Icelandic waters. He was sickly throughout his captivity. At one point he became blind. Several therapies were tried, including ozone therapy and herbal remedies at the last, but to no avail. He died in Marineland of Antibes on July 24, 1982. A necropsy revealed a lung abscess.

Kim II

Kim II was a male orca who was captured at the age of 2 in October 1982 with Freya, Haida II and Nootka IV in Iceland. He was then sold to Marineland Antibes with Freya for reproduction. He sired many calves : Shouka, Inouk, Wikie and Valentin. Kim II was 6,3m long and weighted 5 tons. He was very close to his daughter Shouka but she was sent to Six Flags, later to SeaWorld San Diego. Kim II died on November 23, 2005, of pneumonia.

Kiska
Kiska was an Icelandic killer whale who was likely born sometime around 1976. She was captured at about 3 years old, sometime in November of 1979 in Ingólfshöfði, Iceland. Shortly after her capture, Kiska was moved to the Hafnarfjörður Aquarium. At the end of the month Kiska was purchased by MarineLand of Canada.

Kiska's first calf was a male born on August 24, 1992. He only survived for 2 months. Her second calf was a male named Kanuck who was born on August 28, 1994 and died sometime in 1998. Her third calf was a male named Nova who was born on November 6, 1996 and died on August 20, 2001. Her fourth calf was a male named Hudson who was born on September 15, 1998 and died at age 6 in October 20, 2004. Hudson was her longest-living calf. Her last calf was a female named Athena who was born on August 8, 2004. Athena died in Spring of 2009. It has been thought that Kiska's mate, Kandu VII, may had passed down genes that resulted in multiple of his calves been born with illnesses.

When Nootka and Athena eventually passed away, Ikaika became Kiska's only companion. In November of 2011, Ikaika was transferred to SeaWorld San Diego after a long custody battle leaving Kiska the only living orca at MarineLand of Canada. Kiska continued to live at MarineLand of Canada until her death on March 9, 2023.

A necropsy was performed and the cause of death was determined to be a bacterial infection.

Kohana
Kohana was a female born at SeaWorld San Diego on May 3, 2002. She was the second orca to be conceived through artificial insemination. Her parents were Takara and Tilikum. On April 25, 2004, Kohana and her mother were moved to SeaWorld Orlando. On February 13, 2006, Kohana was moved to Loro Parque in Spain with three other orcas: Tekoa, Keto, and Skyla. She often floated at the acrylic glass to interact with visitors. She was intelligent and eager, and learned quickly.

On October 13, 2010, Kohana gave birth to her first calf (a male) named Adán, in the parks "Orca Ocean"  exhibit, after a four-hour labor. Kohana's calf was the first orca born in Loro Parque. On August 3, 2012, Kohana gave birth to her second calf (a female) named Victoria (or Vicky).
Like her older brother, Victoria was rejected by Kohana. On June 16, 2013, Victoria suddenly died at the age of 10 months. Vicky's cause of death was later revealed to be intestinal problems. Kohana suddenly passed away September 14, 2022 due to cardiac malformation, a defect that forms while the calf is in the womb. Leaving 3 Males, Keto, Tekoa, and Adán and 1 female Morgan

Kyara
Kyara was a female orca, that was born at SeaWorld San Antonio on April 19, 2017. Her mother was Takara and her father Kyuquot, with Kyara's name being a combination of her parents names. Due to SeaWorld ending its orca breeding program, Kyara was the last orca to be born in its parks. On July 22 it was announced that she was showing signs of pneumonia. Because of this, she had been moved to SeaWorld's animal care hospital for treatment. She died on July 24, 2017.

Moby Doll

Moby Doll was the second captive orca ever displayed by a public aquarium, and unlike Wanda, the first, he survived in captivity for nearly three months compared to less than two days. Years later, a recording of his calls enabled scientist John Ford to identify Moby Doll as a member of J Pod of the Southern Residents, the population of orcas most damaged by captures.

The 15 foot (4.6m) long juvenile male orca was harpooned by Vancouver Aquarium collectors in 1964 near East Point, Saturna Island in British Columbia. The orca's size indicated he was most likely 5 years old. After not dying as had been planned, the orca was led to Vancouver using the harpoon line like a leash. There he was given improvised accommodation at Burrard Dry Dock. The following day, July 18, the dock was opened for the general public to watch the novel captive. Subsequently, the public was kept away, however, and Moby Doll was moved to a seapen at Jericho Beach. His health during his captivity was never very good, and he died on October 9.

This young J Pod orca paid a high price, though this first close contact with an orca initiated, for both the general public and scientists, a great change in their understanding of the previously hated species. Particular scientific impacts were made by Moby Doll's extraordinary brain and sophisticated use of sound.

Nakai
On September 1, 2001, Nakai was born to Kasatka, with Tilikum being the father. Unlike most orcas, he was born head first. He was the first orca to be conceived through artificial insemination with a successful birth. He lived at SeaWorld San Diego. As a mature adolescent with nine other whales, including his half brother Makani, his half sister Kalia and his half brother Ikaika, he lived there his entire life. In late September 2012, Nakai sustained a serious injury to his chin. SeaWorld stated that the injury occurred during "contact with the pool's environment". Nakai was one of the few captive males over the age of 10 to not have a collapsed dorsal fin, other males such as Ikaika and Trua are younger, have shorter fins, and have fully collapsed dorsal fins. The right side of his tail fluke was curved under but the left side had not curved. Nakai died on August 4, 2022 after an infection.

Namu

Namu was only the third orca captured and displayed in an aquarium exhibit, and was the subject of a film that changed some people's attitudes toward orcas. In June 1965, William Lechkobit found a 22-foot (6.7m) male orca in his floating salmon net that had drifted close to shore near Namu, British Columbia. The orca was sold for $8,000 to Ted Griffin, a Seattle public aquarium owner. Griffin swam and performed with Namu in the Seattle exhibit and Namu survived one year in captivity before dying in his pen on July 9, 1966.

Neocia
Neocia was born in October 1992, a female calf of Nootka 5 and Kandu 7. Also known as 'Baby October', she was separated from her mother at the age of 3 and kept in a smaller tank at Marineland Canada with three other young orcas. She was often moved because of her aggressive behavior toward the other orcas in an attempt to dominate them. Neocia was impregnated by her own father Kandu; however, this pregnancy miscarried. Neocia died at the age of 12 after losing her appetite and "not acting normally".

Nepo

Nepo was captured with several other orcas including Corky on December 11, 1969. He and a capture mate Yaka were sold to a place called Marine World/Africa USA in California. The two orcas joined another female Kianu who had been at the park since 1968. Kianu wanted Nepo to herself and she would attack Yaka whenever the other female was with Nepo. Nepo, who was very close to Yaka, protected her from Kianu's attacks. The aggressive behavior continued, and Kianu was transferred to a park in Japan. Nepo and Yaka starred in the 1977 horror film Orca. Nepo died from pneumonia on July 10, 1980. Yaka stayed by his side as he took his final breaths. When trainers arrived to take Nepo's body away, Yaka refused to leave him, and it took the trainers a while to separate the whales. Nepo was about 15 years old.

Nyar

Nyar was born at SeaWorld Orlando Florida on New Year's Eve (December 31) 1993. She was born to parents Gudrun and Tilikum. Nyar suffered from many health problems. Sometimes trainers would have to separate Gudrun and Nyar because the mother would try to drown her daughter. They had some bonding moments together. Nyar was not able to perform in shows as she was a very slow learner. She was even put with her father Tilikum sometimes. He was very gentle with her. Nyar died on April 1, 1996. She was 2 years 4 months and 1 day old. The cause of death was Immune System Failure. The name "Nyar" (spelled Nýár in Icelandic) means "New Year" .

Orky II
Orky II was captured in April 1968 off of Pender Harbor, is well remembered as the father of Orkid and Kayla. He spent many of his years in captivity at Marineland of the Pacific. Corky II accompanied him, and the two were thought to be cousins, as they were both from the same pod. He fathered all seven of Corky II's unsuccessful calves. Orky was transferred to SeaWorld San Diego California along with Corky II in the year 1986. There, he was soon put to the bottom of the dominancy ladder. Orky was involved in one trainer incident in 1987, where he accidentally breached on a miscue and landed on a trainer (John Sillick) while the trainer was riding Corky II as a stunt.

While in service to Sea World, Orky mated with two of their females, Kandu V and Kenau. Kandu bore her first successful calf, Orkid, three days before he died on September 26, 1988. She was named in his memory: Orky's Kid. About two months later, Kenau also gave birth to her calf, another female who was later named Kayla. Orky's death was brought on by acute pneumonia and chronic wasting, which meant he lost a lot of weight before he died. His dorsal fin flopped completely over to his right rather than the left. His pectorals were huge and his flukes were curled completely. His enormous size can be seen in his daughter, Orkid, who grew up to be quite a large female. She is Orky's only living (captive) relative. At one time Orky was actually called "Snorky". At almost 22 feet long and 11,000 pounds, he was one of the largest whales ever held in any aquarium.

Samoa

Samoa was a female captured off Iceland in 1983. Samoa was reported to have died due to complications of giving birth. However, her necropsy revealed she had a rare Saksenaea vasiformis fungal infection which likely caused the stillbirth and her death. On March 14, 1992, while held at SeaWorld Texas, Samoa went into premature labour, and died giving birth to a female calf a few hours later. The calf was stillborn. It was the first reported death of a SeaWorld orca while giving birth. The age of Samoa at the time of her death was estimated to be 12–14.

Shamu

Captured by Ted Griffin in Puget Sound in 1965, Shamu was intended to be a companion for the orca Namu in Griffin's Seattle aquarium. Shamu was, however, quickly leased and eventually sold to SeaWorld San Diego. She performed in several SeaWorld shows and eventually died on August 23, 1971. The name Shamu has since been used for many different orcas in SeaWorld shows.

Skana
Skana was taken into captivity during the Yukon Harbor orca capture operation, which was the first planned, deliberate trapping of a large group of orcas (killer whales). 15 southern resident orcas were trapped by Ted Griffin and his Seattle Public Aquarium party on 15 February, 1967, in Yukon Harbor on the west side of Puget Sound. Three orcas died during the capture, and five were transferred to the aquarium, including Skana, Ramu I and Kandu I.  The others were released.  Skana was believed to be six years old at the time of her capture.  She was sold and transferred to the Vancouver Aquarium on March 10, 1967. She was by herself in Vancouver until the end of 1968, when the recently captured Hyak II arrived. She died on October 5, 1980, at the approximate age of 19 years, from a mycotic infection.

Splash
Splash was born in 1989 in Marineland in Canada, transferred to SeaWorld San Diego at the age of 3 and died there in 2005. He was a well loved animal. "He was the one that bonded the best with the trainers," said veterinarian Reidarson. Splash was prone to seizures, and at one point had to have the teeth in his lower jaw removed due to a violent seizure injury. Splash was among the park's most sickly animals. "We brought him back from life-threatening illnesses many times," Reidarson recalled. In 1994, Splash smashed face-first into the wall of his tank, ripping a book-sized patch of skin along his jaw that had to be repaired surgically. Splash died of an infection. Ex SeaWorld trainer John Hargrove, who worked closely with Splash, suggested that Splash died so young partly due to consuming large quantities of sand, presumably because of the boredom of captivity.

Spooky

Spooky was the second calf born to parents Corky II and Orky II at Marineland of the Pacific on Halloween of 1978 (October 31). Unlike most orcas, he was born head first. He earned his name just for the holiday. Spooky was in good health at first, but it wasn't to last. Due to the circular tank the orcas were kept in, Corky had trouble nursing her son. Trainers took over and bottle fed Spooky hoping to help him survive. Spooky died 11 days later on November 10, 1978, from pneumonia and colitis. Spooky's breed was 100% Northern Resident orca.

Sumar
Sumar (May 14, 1998 – September 7, 2010) was a male orca born at SeaWorld Orlando in Florida. His mother was Taima and he was her first calf. Just six months after birth, an incident happened when, during a show, his mother attacked him, pushing him against the glass, trying to make him fall. The crowd was evacuated and the show canceled. The trainers tried to move Taima to another tank and finally separated her from her son. Since then, the two of them have been always separated and Kalina and Katina became his surrogate mothers until he was transferred to SeaWorld San Diego in California on March 8, 1999. Afterwards, he spent a few months at now-closed SeaWorld Ohio before being transferred back to the San Diego park.

He was considered very gentle with other orcas and trainers. At the time of his death he was one of three males at the park, and was seen as a possible breeding male in the future; Nakai, the younger male, is still too young to breed, and the older male Ulises seems to have a low sperm count. Sumar was approaching full size for a typical bull orca when he died: his dorsal fin was more and more leaning to its left and his flukes were beginning to curl under. He was often used for shows in the park. The theme of a June 2010 episode of Cupcake Wars was Sumar's twelfth birthday.

Sumar died at SeaWorld in San Diego, California, on Tuesday, September 7, 2010, at the age of 12. Trainers noticed that the whale was not feeling well on Monday, September 6, 2010, which resulted in veterinarians being notified, blood samples drawn, and antibiotics administered. Despite measures taken by Sumar's veterinarian team, Sumar became increasingly ill by Tuesday. He died shortly before 1:45 PM (Pacific time). Sumar's death prompted the canceling of the park's orca shows for the day. His death was determined to be as a result of a twisted intestinal tract (intestinal volvulus). He was set to be the next captive breeding bull orca, after his father Tilikum.

Taima
Taima (pronounced Ty-EE-Ma) (July 11, 1989 – June 6, 2010) was a transient/Icelandic hybrid female orca who lived at SeaWorld Orlando in Florida. Her name purportedly comes from a Native American or Icelandic language, and means "crash of thunder". She was born tail-first around 16:45 EST during a thunderstorm.  

Taima was born to mother Gudrun and father Kanduke. Kanduke was a member of the Pacific transient orca community, which meant Taima had transient blood in her. In 1990, Kanduke died at the age of 20 from St. Louis encephalitis; Gudrun gave birth to Taima's half-sister Nyar in 1993. Nyar suffered frequent illness and it was reported that Gudrun tried to drown her during several shows. Trainers believe that this confused Taima, as she witnessed this and thought this was how to raise a calf. She was later reported to have performed this on her own calves, Sumar, Tekoa, and Malia. Gudrun died in 1996 from stillbirth complications, and Nyar died from an illness a few months later in April.

On May 14, 1998, Taima gave birth to a male calf named Sumar. They were separated when he was about eight months old because of the aggression between them. On one occasion while performing, Taima started biting Sumar, and throwing him out of the pool, onto the trainer's platform. She then slid out herself and started biting him. The show was stopped, and Taima was pulled to the other swimming pool. A few months later Sumar was transferred to SeaWorld San Diego in California.

On November 8, 2000, at 3:47 pm, Taima gave birth to a male named Tekoa. He began feeding overnight and was estimated to be 7 feet (2.2 m) long and weigh . During the birth, Kalina assisted Taima and helped the calf to the surface for its first breath. Tekoa was sent to SeaWorld San Antonio in 2004, and was later sent to Loro Parque in Tenerife in February 2006, where he remains today. After Tekoa's attack, Taima was separated from all other whales except Tilikum, until she gave birth again to her first daughter Malia in 2007, on March 12.  "At birth Malia (Hawaiian for "calm and peaceful") measured about 6 feet and weighed in at around 350 pounds. Her father is Tilikum." Seaworld announced on May 18, 2010, that Taima was pregnant again.

Taima died from complications to a stillborn male calf on June 6, 2010. Preliminary indications suggested that her death was caused by placenta previa, a condition in which the placenta is delivered before the calf.

Taku
Taku (September 9, 1993 – October 17, 2007) was a male orca, who was born at SeaWorld Orlando in Florida. After birth, Taku spent most of his time with his mother Katina or Nyar, his younger half-sister. Three years later, Katina gave birth again to a female, Unna. On August 25, 2002, Katina gave birth to her fifth calf: a male, Ikaika. Unna was later moved to SeaWorld San Antonio in December 2002. Afterwards, Ikaika and Taku bonded to the point where Ikaika swam in mother-calf-position with Taku. On November 18, 2006, Taku was moved to SeaWorld San Antonio whereas Ikaika was moved to Marineland of Canada in Ontario.

Takara soon became pregnant. On November 23, 2005, around 21:50 EST (4:50 PM), Takara went into labor with her second calf. Her daughter Kohana was at her side. Thirty-two minutes later around 22:22 EST (5:22 PM), Takara gave birth to a male calf (Taku's son/first calf) who was later to be named Trua. Taku sired another calf in 2006 with his mother Katina – Nalani, who was also his sister and the first surviving inbred calf.

Trainers were notified that Taku had been acting differently the Wednesday before his death. A NMFS Marine Mammal Inventory Report lists the cause of death as "severe multifocal interstitial pneumonia"; however, there are also peer-reviewed sources which have reported,  based on necropsy results, the cause of death as West Nile virus contracted via a mosquito bite.

Tilikum
 

Tilikum (sometimes misspelled Tillikum) was a bull orca involved in three human deaths while he was in captivity, one at Sealand of the Pacific and two at Seaworld Orlando. He was captured near Iceland in November 1983 at about two years of age. He was the largest orca in captivity and also the most successful sire in captivity, with 21 offspring, 7 of which are still alive.

While at Sealand of the Pacific, Tilikum sired his first calf when he was about eight or nine years old. His first son, Kyuquot, was born to Haida II on December 24, 1991. Just a few months prior to the birth of Kyuquot, Tilikum killed his trainer Keltie Byrne. Seaworld requested an emergency transfer of Tilikum to their facility. Tilikum was moved to SeaWorld Orlando, Florida, on January 9, 1992. Sealand of the Pacific closed soon thereafter.

Following his arrival at SeaWorld, Tilikum sired many calves with many different females. His first calf born in Orlando was to Katina. Katina gave birth to Taku on September 9, 1993. Taku died on October 17, 2007. While at SeaWorld, Tilikum killed two people, Daniel P. Dukes and Dawn Brancheau.

Tilikum's other calves are: Nyar (born 1993, died 1996), Unna (1996–2015), Sumar (1998–2010), Tuar (1999), Tekoa (2000), Nakai (2001-2022), Kohana (2002-2022), Ikaika (2002), Skyla (2004–2021), Malia (2007), Sakari (2010) and Makaio (2010).  On January 6, 2017, SeaWorld announced that Tilikum had died early in the morning of bacterial pneumonia.

Unna
Unna was a female orca. She was born on December 27, 1996, at SeaWorld Orlando. Her parents were Katina (mother) and Tilikum. She was Katina's fourth calf and Tilikum's seventh (fourth successful), and was the second calf to be born to the pair. Unna lived with her mother, father, siblings, and other whales at her birthplace in Orlando for the first six years of her life.
In December 2002, Unna was transferred to SeaWorld San Antonio. In late April 2006, Unna gave birth to a stillborn calf. Unna recovered well from her stillbirth. In late Summer 2015, Unna came down with a strain of fungus known as Candida. After several months of intense treatment, Unna died on December 21, 2015. from a systemic bacterial infection. .

Vigga
Vigga (Little Sweetheart) was born in 1977 near Iceland, and brought to Marine World Africa USA Park, then located in Redwood City California, in 1980. Vigga shared her tank at the park with another female orca, Yaka, who had lost her mate Nepo a few months before Vigga was introduced to the park. Yaka and Vigga lived together at Marine World until Yaka died in 1997 at age 32. She made the move with Yaka to the Park's new quarters in Vallejo California in 1986. Vigga was over 16 feet long and weighed 5,000 pounds. Vigga died on Monday, August 14, 2000, at approximately 8 p.m. An abnormal heart pathology resulting in a build-up of fluid in her pericardial sac, and an infection in one lung is the suspected cause of death.

Walter

At the 1967 Vancouver Boat Show at the PNE (Pacific National Exhibition) grounds, "a star was born by the name of Walter and the attraction helped the show...to an attendance record of more than 100,000."

The Boat Show's producer Bob O'Loughlin had for years "hoped to display a live killer whale at one of his traveling sports shows," but he had failed in several attempts to catch one at Seattle. His hopes were finally fulfilled after the Yukon Harbor capture operation, when Seattle Public Aquarium owner Ted Griffin trapped 15 Southern Resident Killer Whales, probably all from K Pod, in Yukon Harbor in Puget Sound on February 15, 1967. Griffin had hoped to deliver a rented orca to O'Loughlin for the Boat, Trailer and Sports Show in Portland, Oregon, which opened February 17. Corralling selected whales out of the 15 held in Yukon Harbor proved to be a long and difficult process, however, and the Portland show closed before Griffin could secure an orca for it, but the traveling show moved to Vancouver, British Columbia, and the rental agreement continued.

Before he had received a whale, "O'Loughlin's three children, ages 6 to 9, [had] decided on a name...Would you believe?—Walter the Whale." At an estimated , the orca chosen for the Vancouver Boat Show was the largest and eldest of the five secured at the Seattle Public Aquarium, and the last to arrive, on March 4. Griffin personally managed the whole rental operation, remaining with Walter throughout the Vancouver Boat Show, which ran from March 10 to 19. Following continual phone calls from irate citizens who didn't "want Walter to become another Moby Doll or Namu," the SPCA checked the tank and raised concerns over its size, and over the orca's separation from the other members of the pod, but basically accepted the situation.

Griffin was trying to wean all the captured orcas onto dead herring, and only fed Walter twice in a week to keep the orca hungry. Nonetheless, the Southern Resident killer whale was reluctant to eat the food, and was force fed with a pump.

"Each hour, hundreds of sightseers filed into the tent, where Griffin gave a brief presentation about orcas, assuring listeners that the species was far friendlier than most believed. Visitors could then approach the pool, where the bravest could offer the whale herring and even rub his rubbery skin."

On March 16, Vancouver's leading radio host Jack Webster broadcast Walter in "the first whale-to-whale telephone call in history." At the other end of the line at the Seattle Public Aquarium were two younger podmates—Katy and Kandu.

The Vancouver Aquarium did not want to let the rented star leave the city, and bought Walter. Assistant curator Vince Penfold donned a scuba suit and welcomed the orca with lunch underwater, captured in a photograph in the Vancouver Sun. The whale was fed " of fish, mostly ling cod and herring, in four daily feedings."

In Walter's new tank at the Vancouver Aquarium, Penfold reversed the gender problem he had had with Moby Doll. This time a 'masculine' name had been given to a female whale. The name Walter was not considered fitting, and the aquarium selected for her the name Skana.

Wanda
The captive orca who was given the name Wanda is famous for being the first to be exhibited alive by an aquarium, preceding Moby Doll by more than two years. Wanda was a mature North Pacific offshore ecotype, as confirmed by much later DNA analysis.

The orca was spotted by boaters alone near Newport Beach, California, on 17 November 1961, and reports reached Marineland of the Pacific.

The next day, Marineland collectors led by Frank Brocato finally netted her after she had evaded their capture efforts for nine hours, watched by thousands of spectators. In the last stage of the whale's transportation to a tank at Marineland, she slipped out of her sling and smashed head-first into the wall of the tank. Crowds poured into the aquarium on the 19th to see the "monster of the deep," as orcas were characterized.

Brocato recalled the events of the morning of the 20th thus: "But the next day, she went crazy. She started swimming at high speed around the tank, striking her body repeatedly. Finally, she convulsed and died."

Wanda was referred to as "The Newport Specimen" by Marineland in the necropsy report. It found that death was due to pneumonia, and acute gastroenteritis secondary to a massive nematode infestation. Among her many long standing health conditions, excessive tooth wear was not understood. It was not until the discovery of the Offshore type of orca decades later that this condition was linked to their predation on Pacific sleeper sharks.

Wanda revealed that orcas could be a unique, crowd-pulling attraction. Her legacy was the succession of capture attempts made by Marineland of the Pacific, initially off California. Then in September 1962 in Washington waters off the west side of San Juan Island, Brocato lassoed a female salmon-eating Southern Resident Killer Whale. When she and an accompanying male thumped his boat with their flukes, Brocato started shooting from his rifle, killing the female—the first of many Southern Residents to be killed in capture operations. Her body was towed to Bellingham to be rendered for dog food.

Marineland of the Pacific did not manage to display another orca until 1967, when they acquired a calf who had blundered into a fishing net near Port Hardy. This northern resident orca became the first Orky. But by this time they had been upstaged by competitors, notably SeaWorld.

Winston

Winston, originally known as Ramu, was captured near Coupeville, Washington, in 1970 and lived in Windsor Safari park and SeaWorld San Diego. He died in 1986. He was the father of the original Baby Shamu, Kalina.

Yaka
Yaka (Pronounced: Yah-Kah) (1966–1997), was a Pacific Northwest orca. She died on October 29, 1997, after 27 years in captivity. She was approximately 31 years old, the third oldest orca in captivity at the time. The cause of her death was supposedly pneumonia. She came to Marine World Africa USA located in Redwood City California in December 1969 together with male Nepo after being captured off the coast of British Columbia. Nepo and Yaka starred in the 1977 horror film Orca. Nepo died in July 1980, leaving Yaka alone. In November 1980, the Icelandic female orca Vigga became her tank mate. Yaka was 10 years older than Vigga. They made the move together when the park relocated to Vallejo, California, in 1986. Vigga died 3 years after Yaka in August 2000.

Yaka was a member of the A5 Pod, as is Corky.

Juliet

Juliet is a Russian Transient orca. She was captured in 2014 and currently resides at the Moskvarium, an aquarium within the Exhibition of Achievements of National Economy. In 2019, footage of Juliet beaching during a performance at the Moskvarium whilst staff took no attempt to assist her went viral, leading to an outcry from activists for a ban on orca captivity and breeding.

See also 
 :Category:Individual orcas
 List of individual cetaceans
 Captive orca
 Orca attack
 Keiko, the star of the 1993 movie Free Willy
 SeaWorld
 Shamu

References

External links 
 Orca Spirit: Site dedicated to Orcas
 SeaWorld Florida Family

Webarchive template wayback links
Individual orcas
orca
Orcas

orca
orca
Southern resident orcas
orca
Cetacean research and conservation